Albert Ernest Linton (February 17, 1880 – August 6, 1957) was a Canadian amateur soccer player who competed in the 1904 Summer Olympics. Linton was born in Scotland. In 1904 he was a member of the Galt F.C. team, which won the gold medal in the soccer tournament. He played both matches as a goalkeeper, keeping a clean slate in both.

References

External links

1880 births
1957 deaths
Canadian soccer players
Association football goalkeepers
Footballers at the 1904 Summer Olympics
Olympic gold medalists for Canada
Olympic soccer players of Canada
Soccer people from Ontario
Scottish emigrants to Canada
Olympic medalists in football
Medalists at the 1904 Summer Olympics